This is a list of baronetcies conferred upon British expatriates and non-British nationals.

America
 Sir William Johnson, 1st Baronet, of New York in North America (1755), extant
 Sir Egerton Leigh, 1st Baronet, of the Province of South Carolina, America (1773), dormant
 Sir Robert Eden, 1st Baronet, of the Province of Maryland, America (1776), extant

Australia

South Australia
 Sir Samuel Way, 1st Baronet, of Montefiore, in South Australia (1899), extinct 1916

Victoria
 Sir William Clarke, 1st Baronet, of Rupertswood, in the Colony of Victoria (1882), extant

New South Wales
 Sir Daniel Cooper, 1st Baronet, of Woollahra, in New South Wales (1863), extant
 Sir Charles Nicholson, 1st Baronet, of Luddenham, in New South Wales (1859), extinct 1986

The Bahamas
 Sir Harry Oakes, 1st Baronet, of Nassau, in the Bahama Islands (1939), extant

Barbados
 Sir John Alleyne, 1st Baronet, of Four Hills, in Barbados (1769), extant

Canada

 Sir Thomas Temple, 1st Baronet, of Nova Scotia, in the Colony of Nova Scotia (1662), extinct 1674
 Sir George Arthur, 1st Baronet, of Upper Canada, in the United Province of Canada (1841), extant
 Sir John Beverley Robinson, 1st Baronet, of Toronto, in the United Province of Canada (1854), dormant
 Sir Allan Napier MacNab, 1st Baronet, of Dundurn Castle, in the United Province of Canada (1858), extinct 1862
 Sir Samuel Cunard, 1st Baronet, of Bush Hill, Nova Scotia, in the United Province of Canada (1859), extinct 1989
 Sir John Rose, 1st Baronet, of Montreal, in the Dominion of Canada (1872), extant
 Sir Charles Tupper, 1st Baronet, of Armdale, Nova Scotia, in the Dominion of Canada (1888), extant
 Sir Edward Seaborne Clouston, 1st Baronet, of Montreal, in the Dominion of Canada (1908), extinct 1912
 Sir Joseph Wesley Flavelle, 1st Baronet, of Toronto, in the Dominion of Canada (1917), extinct 1985
 Sir James Hamet Dunn, 1st Baronet, of Bathurst, New Brunswick, in the Dominion of Canada (1921), extinct 1976

India
 Sir Jamsetjee Jejeebhoy, 1st Baronet, of Bombay (1857), extant
 Sir Dinshaw Maneckji Petit, 1st Baronet, of Petit Hall, on the Island of Bombay (1890), extant
 Sir Jehangir Cowasji Jehangir Readymoney, 1st Baronet, of Bombay (1908), extant
 Sir Currimbhoy Ebrahim, 1st Baronet, of Pabaney Villa, of Bombay (1910), extant
 Sir Chinubhai Madhowlal Ranchhodlal, 1st Baronet, of Shahpur, in Ahmedabad (1913), extant
 Sir Albert Abdullah David Sassoon, 1st Baronet, of Kensington Gore (1890), extinct 1939
 Sir Jacob Sassoon, 1st Baronet, of Bombay (1909), extinct 1961
 Sir Bhimchandra Chatterjee, 1st Baronet, of Calcutta (1906), extant

Netherlands
 Sir Willem Boreel, 1st Baronet, of Amsterdam (1645) -  the 8th baronet also became Jonkheer in the Dutch nobility, extant
 Sir Joseph van Colster, 1st Baronet, of Amsterdam (1645), extinct 1665
 Sir Walter de Raedt, 1st Baronet, of The Hague (1660), extinct 
 Sir Cornelis Tromp, 1st Baronet, Lieutenant-Admiral of Holland (1675) - also created Ridder in the Dutch nobility, extinct 1691
 Sir Richard Tulp, 1st Baronet, of Amsterdam (1675), extinct 1690
 Sir Gelebrand Sas van Bosch, 1st Baronet, of Rotterdam (1680), extinct 1720
 Sir Cornelis Speelman, 1st Baronet, of Brabant (1686) - Sir Cornelis Jacob Speelman, 3rd Baronet also became Jonkheer in the Dutch nobility, extinct 2005
 Sir John Peter van den Brande, 1st Baronet, of Cleverskerke  (1699), extinct 1750

New Zealand
 Sir Charles Clifford, 1st Baronet, of Flaxbourne, in New Zealand (1887), extant
 Sir Joseph Ward, 1st Baronet, of Wellington, in New Zealand (1911), extant

South Africa
 Sir Andries Stockenström, 1st Baronet, of Cape of Good Hope (1840), extinct 1957
 Sir Julius Wernher, 1st Baronet, of Luton Hoo Park, in the Parish of Luton and County of Bedford (1905), extinct 1973
 Sir Joseph Robinson, 1st Baronet, of Hawthornden, in the Cape Province, and Dudley House, in Westminster (1908), extant
 Sir David Graaff, 1st Baronet, of Cape Town, in the Cape of Good Hope Province, of the Union of South Africa (1911), extant
 Sir George Farrar, 1st Baronet, of Chicheley Hall, in Buckinghamshire (1911), extinct 1915
 Sir Leander Starr Jameson, 1st Baronet, of Down Street, in London (1911), extinct 1917
 Sir George Albu, 1st Baronet, of Johannesburg (1912), extant
 Sir Lionel Phillips, 1st Baronet, of Tylney Hall (1912), extant
 Sir Sothern Holland, 1st Baronet, of Westwell Manor, in the County of Oxford (1917), extinct 1997
 Sir Abe Bailey, 1st Baronet, of South Africa (1919), extant
 Sir Bernard Oppenheimer, 1st Baronet, of Stoke Poges, in the County of Buckingham (1921), extinct 2020
 Sir Otto Beit, 1st Baronet, of Tewin Water (1924), extinct 1994
 Sir Lewis Richardson, 1st Baronet, of Yellow Woods, in the Cape of Good Hope Province, in South Africa (1924), extant

Sweden
 Sir John Frederick von Friesendorf, 1st Baronet, of Hirdech (1661) - also created Reichsfreiherr in the German nobility, his sons created Friherrar in the nobility of Sweden, extant
 Sir Erik Ohlson, 1st Baronet, of Scarborough, in the North Riding of the County of York (1920), extant

See also
 List of extant baronetcies
 List of baronetcies (currently incomplete)
 British Honours System

References and sources

Baronets in the Baronetage of Great Britain